Yin and Yang are the titles of two separate compilation albums by Fish co-released in 1995. They are a retrospective on Fish's four solo albums and four albums with Marillion.

Yin and Yang were released on Fish's independent label Dick Bros Record Company. There also was a "radio edits" promotional release containing eight tracks, each with a roughly one-minute-long introduction spoken by Fish. This CD was also available as a fan-club mail-order edition.

Music
Thirteen of the 26 tracks across both albums have been re-recorded (including all the Marillion tracks) or remixed; the rest remain in their original versions.

The re-recorded Marillion tracks are "Punch & Judy", "Incubus" (from Fugazi, 1984), "Kayleigh", "Lavender" (from Misplaced Childhood, 1985), "Incommunicado" and "Sugar Mice" (Clutching at Straws, 1987). Another track ("Institution Waltz") is a new version of a Marillion song they demoed and played live but never properly recorded.

The re-recorded solo tracks are "State of Mind" (1990, from Vigil in a Wilderness of Mirrors), "Credo", "Lucky", "Favourite Stranger", "Just Good Friends" (now a duet with Sam Brown) (1991, from Internal Exile), and "Somebody Special" (1994, from Suits).

The title track of the 1991 album Internal Exile appears in its previously unreleased original version recorded in 1989. It would later become a bonus track on re-issues of Vigil in a Wilderness of Mirrors.

The set also contains three cover versions: 
Sandy Denny's "Solo" appears as found on the 1993 covers album Songs from the Mirror.  "Time and a Word" is a Yes song recorded during the Songs from the Mirror sessions, but left off the original version of that album. Instead, it first appeared on the compilation Outpatients '93, though it has since been included on a re-issue of Songs from the Mirror. Yes guitarist Steve Howe, who appears as a guest musician on this track, was not yet in Yes when the song was written. There is a version of the Sensational Alex Harvey Band's "Boston Tea Party", which is not identical with the one on Songs from the Mirror, but was newly recorded with the members of the original SAHB line-up.

Personnel
The new versions of existing material were recorded by Fish's then-current line-up: Frank Usher, Robin Boult (guitars), Foster Paterson (keyboards), David Paton (bass), and Dave Stewart (drums). Stewart had recently replaced Kevin Wilkinson, who had moved on to The Proclaimers. "Just Good Friends", originally from Internal Exile but presented here as a duet featuring Sam Brown, was also released as a lead single. All the new tracks were mixed and produced by James Cassidy, who had previously worked on Songs from the Mirror and Suits.

Cover
The outside cover, a relatively simple concept based on the yin and yang symbol (with each element in the shape of a fish) surrounded by a circular Celtic knot pattern, was again designed by permanent Fish collaborator Mark Wilkinson. The Yin version of the cover has a black symbol on a white/greyish background, the Yang version has a white symbol against a dark-red/black background. (On the Radio Edits CD cover, the two fishes are in different colours, more similar to the actual yin and yang symbol.) "1980 1995" is written in the upper left corner, apparently in reference to Marillion. Actually, Fish did not join Marillion until 1981, making this a somewhat dubious attempt at citing an anniversary as the occasion for this retrospective. The booklets contain several photographs of Fish mostly taken on the Scottish coast.

Single
The new version of "Just Good Friends", a duet with Sam Brown, was released as a lead single on 14 August 1995. It failed to enter the UK top 40, spending one week at #63 in the UK Singles Chart.

Tour
The album was supported by an extensive 80-date world tour, at that time the longest Fish had undertaken since leaving Marillion. It included several countries never covered by any previous tours (some of which are rarely visited by international acts), such as Argentina, Bosnia, Brazil, Chile, Croatia, Estonia, Hong Kong, Singapore, Slovakia, Turkey. There were also six gigs in Poland, one of which (originally captured for national TV) would later be released as the video and live album Krakow. The tour was briefly stopped when, while in Estonia, bassist David Paton was called away on a family matter but never returned. He was replaced by Ewen Vernal (formerly of Deacon Blue).

Track listing

Yin

Yang

Charts 
Yin

Yang

References

External links
Discography entry for Yin on official Fish site
Discography entry for Yang on official Fish site

1995 compilation albums
Fish (singer) albums